Urupema is a municipality in the state of Santa Catarina in the South region of Brazil. It has an area of approximately 353 km² and a population of 2,459 inhabitants as of 2020. It is often cited as the coldest city in Brazil.

Early history
The name Urupema (with variations including urupemba, arupemba, gurupema and jurupema) refers to a sieve made of vegetal fiber and used domestically to sieve cornmeal and cassava flour and in fishing.

The city's first inhabitants were attracted by the abundance of resources provided by the local Paraná pines, a coniferous tree which, at the time, was the main source of food for native populations during fall and winter. Unlike Amerindians in North America who used the fur of bisons and moose, the natives of Brazil did not have any similar large animals available.

Urupema became a municipality on 4 January 1988. Its patron saint is Saint Anne.

Climate
Urupema has a temperate oceanic climate (Köppen Cfb). Together with São Joaquim, Urubici, Bom Jardim da Serra and São José dos Ausentes, Urupema is considered the coldest city in Brazil if the maximum average temperature and the number of cold hours are considered. It is also the coldest in terms of absolute minimums together with Bom Jardim da Serra. Snowfall occurs during the winter and less frequently in fall and spring.

See also
Snow in Brazil
List of municipalities in Santa Catarina

References

Municipalities in Santa Catarina (state)